The Little Cedar River is an  river of Iowa and Minnesota.

The Little Cedar rises in Mower County, Minnesota, and flows primarily south into Iowa, emptying into the Cedar River.

See also
List of rivers of Iowa
List of rivers of Minnesota

References

External links 
Minnesota Watersheds
USGS Geographic Names Information Service

Rivers of Iowa
Rivers of Minnesota
Rivers of Mower County, Minnesota